Cochylimorpha ignicolorana is a species of moth of the family Tortricidae. It is found in Russia (the southern Urals).

Adults have been recorded from wing from June to July.

References

Moths described in 2001
Endemic fauna of Russia
Cochylimorpha
Moths of Asia
Moths of Europe